A Cook Abroad is a BBC television program in which a celebrity chef travels to another country in order to discover recipes. Originally released in 2015, the program attempts to showcase food from different countries and cultures around the world. The opening sequence is "Six cooks, six countries six incredible journeys."

Episodes

References

External links
 
 A Cook Abroad on BBC Two

British cooking television shows
British travel television series
2010s British cooking television series
2010s British travel television series
Television shows filmed in Egypt
Television shows filmed in India
Television shows filmed in Argentina
Television shows filmed in France
Television shows filmed in Australia
Television shows filmed in Malaysia